The Asia/Oceania Zone was one of the three zones of the regional Davis Cup competition in 2000.

In the Asia/Oceania Zone there were four different tiers, called groups, in which teams compete against each other to advance to the upper tier. Winners in Group II advanced to the Asia/Oceania Zone Group I. Teams who lost their respective ties competed in the relegation play-offs, with winning teams remaining in Group II, whereas teams who lost their play-offs were relegated to the Asia/Oceania Zone Group III in 2001.

Participating nations

Draw

 and  relegated to Group III in 2001.
 promoted to Group I in 2001.

First round

Hong Kong vs. Pakistan

Kazakhstan vs. Chinese Taipei

Malaysia vs. Iran

Philippines vs. Indonesia

Second round

Chinese Taipei vs. Pakistan

Malaysia vs. Indonesia

Relegation play-offs

Hong Kong vs. Kazakhstan

Philippines vs. Iran

Third round

Indonesia vs. Chinese Taipei

References

External links
Davis Cup official website

Davis Cup Asia/Oceania Zone
Asia Oceania Zone Group II